Remeniny is a village and municipality in Vranov nad Topľou District in the Prešov Region of eastern Slovakia.

History
In historical records the village was first mentioned in 1356.

Geography
The municipality lies at an altitude of 180 metres and covers an area of 10.592 km². It has a population of about 296 people.

External links
 
http://www.statistics.sk/mosmis/eng/run.html

Villages and municipalities in Vranov nad Topľou District
Šariš